The Scrovegni Chapel, also known as the Arena Chapel, is a small church, adjacent to the Augustinian monastery, the Monastero degli Eremitani in Padua, region of Veneto, Italy. The chapel and monastery are now part of the complex of the Museo Civico of Padua.

The chapel contains a fresco cycle by Giotto, completed about 1305 and considered to be an important masterpiece of Western art.  In 2021, the chapel was declared part of the UNESCO World Heritage Site of the 14th-century fresco cycles comprehending 8 historical buildings in Padua city centre. Specifically the Scrovegni Chapel contains the most important frescoes that marked the beginning of a revolution in mural painting and influenced fresco technique, style, and content for a whole century.

Description
Giotto and his team covered all the internal surfaces of the chapel with frescoes, including the walls and the ceiling. The nave is 20.88 metres long, 8.41 metres wide, and 12.65 metres high. The apse area is composed of a square area (4.49 meters deep and 4.31 meters wide) and a pentagonal area (2.57 meters deep). The largest element is extensive cycles showing the Life of Christ and the Life of the Virgin.  The wall at the rear of the church, through which the chapel is entered, has a large Last Judgement.  There are also panels in grisaille (monochrome) showing the Vices and Virtues.

The church was dedicated to Santa Maria della Carità at the Feast of the Annunciation, 1303, and consecrated in 1305. Much of Giotto's fresco cycle focuses on the life of the Virgin Mary and celebrates her role in human salvation. A motet by Marchetto da Padova appears to have been composed for the dedication on 25 March 1305. The chapel is also known as the Arena Chapel because it was built on land purchased by Enrico Scrovegni that abutted the site of a Roman arena. The space was where an open-air procession and sacred representation of the Annunciation to the Virgin had been played out for a generation before the chapel was built.

History

Building and decoration

The Arena Chapel was commissioned to Giotto by the affluent Paduan banker, Enrico Scrovegni. In the early 1300s Enrico purchased from Manfredo Dalesmanini the area on which the Roman arena had stood. Here he had his luxurious palace built, as well as a chapel annexed to it. The chapel's project was twofold: to serve as the family's private oratory and as a funerary monument for himself and his wife. Enrico commissioned Giotto, the famous Florentine painter, to decorate his chapel. Giotto had previously worked for the Franciscan friars in Assisi and Rimini, and had been in Padua for some time, working for the Basilica of Saint Anthony in the Sala del Capitolo and in the Blessings's Chapel.

A number of 14th-century sources (Riccobaldo Ferrarese, Francesco da Barberino, 1312–1313) testify to Giotto's presence at the Arena Chapel's site. The fresco cycle can be dated with a good approximation to a series of documentary testimonies: the purchase of the land took place on 6 February 1300; the bishop of Padua, Ottobono dei Razzi, authorised the building some time prior to 1302 (the date of his transferral to the Patriarcato of Aquileia); the chapel was first consecrated on 25 March 1303, the feast day of the Annunciation; on 1 March 1304 Pope Benedict XI granted an indulgence to whoever visited the chapel; one year later on 25 March 1305 the chapel received its definitive consecration. Giotto's work thus falls in the period from 25 March 1303 to 25 March 1305.

Giotto, who was born around 1267, was 36–38 years old when he worked at Enrico Scrovegni's chapel. He had a team of about 40 collaborators, and they calculated that 625 work days (giornate) were necessary to paint the chapel. A "work day" meant that portion of each fresco that could be painted before the plaster dried and was no longer "fresh" (fresco in Italian ).

In January 1305, friars from the nearby Church of the Eremitani filed a complaint to the bishop, protesting that Scrovegni had not respected the original agreement. Scrovegni was transforming his private oratory into a church with a bell tower, thus producing unfair competition with the Eremitani's activities. We do not know what happened next, but it is likely that, as a consequence of this complaint, the monumental apse and the wide transept were demolished. Both are visible on a model of the church painted by Giotto on the counter-facade (the Last Judgement). The apse was the section where Enrico Scrovegni had meant to have his tomb. The presence of frescoes dating to after 1320 supports the demolition hypothesis proposed by Giuliano Pisani. The apse, the most significant area in all churches, is where Enrico and his wife, Jacopina d'Este, were buried.

This apse presents a narrowing of the space which gives a sense of its being incomplete and inharmonious. When one observes the lower frame of the triumphal arch, right above Saint Catherine of Alexandria's small altar piece, Giotto's perfect symmetry is altered by a fresco decoration representing two medallions with busts of female saints, a lunette with Christ in glory, and two episodes from the Passion (the prayer in the Garden of Gethsemane and the Flagellation of Christ, which together give an overall sense of disharmony. The artist who painted these scenes also painted the greater part of the apse, an unknown artist called "The Master of the Scrovegni Choir" who worked at the Chapel about twenty years after Giotto's work was completed. The main focus of the unknown artist's work is constituted by six monumental scenes on the side walls of the chancel that depict the last period of Mary's earthly life. This choice is in tune with the iconographic program inspired by Alberto da Padova and painted by Giotto.

Modern period
The chapel was originally connected with the Scrovegni palace, which was built on what remained of the foundations of the elliptical ancient Roman arena. The palace was demolished in 1827 in order to sell the precious materials it contained and to erect two condominiums in its place. The chapel was purchased by the Municipality of the City of Padua in 1881, a year after the City Council's deliberation of 10 May 1880 leading to a decision to demolish the condominiums and restore the chapel.

In June 2001, following a preparation study lasting over 20 years, the Istituto Centrale per il Restauro (Central Institute for Restoration) of the Ministry for Cultural Activities, in collaboration with Padua's Town Hall in its capacity of owner of the Arena Chapel, started a full-scale restoration of Giotto's frescoes under the late Giuseppe Basile's technical direction. In 2000 the consolidation and restoration of the external surfaces had been completed and the adjacent "Corpo Tecnologico Attrezzato" (CTA) had been installed. In this "equipped technological chamber" visitors wait for fifteen minutes to allow their body humidity to be lowered and any accompanying smog dust to be filtered out. In March 2002 the chapel was reopened to the public in its original splendor. A few problems remain unsolved, such as flooding in the crypt under the nave due to the presence of an underlying aquifer, and the negative effect on the building's stability of the cement inserts that replaced the original wooden ones in the 1960s.

Scholarly debates 

Giuliano Pisani's studies argued that a number of commonly held beliefs concerning the chapel are groundless, among them, the notion that Dante inspired Giotto. However, a posthumous portrait of Dante was included in the Paradise section of the frescoes. Another claim was that the theological program followed by Giotto is based on St Thomas Aquinas, whereas Pisani claims it to be wholly Augustinian. Pisani also argued against the conjecture that the Frati Gaudenti fraternity, of which Enrico Scrovegni was a member, influenced the content of Giotto's fresco cycle.   He also argued against the belief that Enrico Scrovegni required that the iconography program have no emphasis placed on the sin of usury. Giuliano Pisani pointed out that Dante's condemnation of Scrovegni's father, Reginaldo, as a usurer in Canto 17 of the Inferno dates to a few years after Giotto's completion of the chapel, so it cannot be regarded as a motive behind any theological anxieties on the part of Enrico Scrovegni. Pisani's arguments have not yet been widely embraced by the scholarly community, and that debates persist regarding the impetus for the chapel's creation and the reasons behind its design.

According to Pisani, Giotto painted the chapel's inner surface following a comprehensive iconographic and decorative project devised by the Augustinian theologian, Friar Alberto da Padova. Among the sources utilized by Giotto following Friar Alberto's advice are the Apocryphal Gospels of Pseudo-Matthew and Nicodemus, the Golden Legend (Legenda aurea) by Jacobus de Voragine and, for a few minute iconographic details, Pseudo-Bonaventure's Meditations on the Life of Jesus Christ, as well as a number of Augustinian texts, such as De doctrina Christiana, De libero arbitrio, De Genesi contra Manicheos, De quantitate animae, and other texts from the Medieval Christian tradition, among which is the Phisiologus.

Most Giotto scholarship believes that Giotto had made a number of theological mistakes. For instance, Giotto placed Hope after Charity in the Virtues series, and did not include Avarice in the Vices series, due to the usual representation of Enrico Scrovegni as a usurer. Giuliano Pisani asserts that Giotto followed a careful and deliberate theological programme based on Saint Augustine and devised by Friar Alberto da Padova.  Avarice, far from being "absent" in Giotto's cycle, is portrayed with Envy, forming with it a fundamental component of a more comprehensive sin. For this reason Envy is placed facing the virtue of Charity, to indicate that Charity is the exact opposite of Envy, and that in order to cure oneself of the sin of Envy one needs to learn from Charity. Charity crushes Envy's money bag under her feet, while on the opposite wall red flames burn under Envy's feet.

The depiction of the sacred stories, and the message of the vault

Giotto frescoed the chapel's whole surface, including the walls and the ceiling. The fresco cycle is organized along four tiers, each of which contains episodes from the stories of the various protagonists of the Sacred History. Each tier is divided into frames, each forming a scene. The chapel is asymmetrical in shape, with six windows on the longer south wall, and this shape determined the layout of the decoration. The first step was choosing to place two frames between each double window set on the south wall; secondly, the width and height of the tiers was fixed in order to calculate the same space on the opposite north wall.

Cycles of scenes showing the Life of Christ and the Life of the Virgin were the grandest form of religious art in the period, and Giotto's cycle is unusually large and comprehensive, showing the ambition of the commission.  Allowing for this, the selection and iconography of the scenes is broadly comparable to other contemporary cycles; Giotto's innovation lies in the monumentality of his forms and the clarity of his compositions.  

The cycle recounts the story of salvation. It starts from high up on the lunette of the triumphal arch, with the uncommon scene of God the Father instructing the Archangel Gabriel to perform the Annunciation to Mary.  The narrative continues with the stories of Joachim and Anne (first tier from the top, south wall) and the stories of Mary (first tier from the top, north wall). After a return to the triumphal arch, the scenes of the Annunciation and the Visitation follow. The stories of Christ were placed on the middle tier of the south and north walls. The scene of Judas receiving the money to betray Jesus is on the triumphal arch. The lower tier of the south and north walls shows the Passion and Resurrection; the last frame on the north wall shows the Pentecost. The fourth tier begins at ground level with the monochromes of the Vices (north wall) and the Virtues (south wall). The west wall (counter-façade) presents the Last Judgment.

The scenes depicted are as follows:

Sacred stories:

Triumphal arch (lunette):
 The Annunciation to Mary;

Upper tier, south wall:
 The Expulsion of Joachim
 Joachim amongst the shepherds
 An angel comes to Anna in prayer announcing the birth of Mary
 Joachim sacrifices a kid goat to the Lord
 Joachim's dream
 Joachim meets Anna at the Golden Gate

Upper tier, north wall:
 Nativity of Mary and her bathing as an infant
 Presentation of Mary at the Temple
 The bringing of the branches
 Prayer for the blossoming of the branches
 The marriage of the Virgin
 The nuptial cortege

Triumphal arch:
 The Annunciation
 Visitation

Middle tier, south wall:
 The Nativity of Jesus
 The Adoration of the Magi
 The Presentation of Jesus at the Temple
 The Flight into Egypt
 The Massacre of the Innocents

Middle tier, north wall:
 The Finding in the Temple (Jesus among the doctors)
 The Baptism of Jesus
 The Wedding at Cana
 The Resurrection of Lazarus
 Christ enters Jerusalem
 Casting out the money changers

Triumphal arch:
 Judas's betrayal

Lower tier, south wall:
 The Last Supper
 The washing of the feet
 The Kiss of Judas
 Jesus before Caiaphas
 Flagellation of Christ

Lower tier, north wall;
 The ascent to Calvary
 Crucifixion
 Lamentation of Christ
 The Resurrection of Jesus — Noli me tangere
 Ascension
 Pentecost

Bottom tier, north wall: Vices:

 Stultitia
 Inconstantia
 Ira
 Iniustitia
 Infidelitas
 Invidia
 Desperatio

Bottom tier, south wall: Seven virtues:
 Prudence
 Fortitude
 Temperance
 Justice
 Faith
 Charity
 Hope

Counter-façade:

 The Last Judgment

The vault presents the eighth day, the time of eternity, God's time, with eight planets (the tondos which enclose the seven great prophets of the Old Testament plus John the Baptist) and two suns (which show God and the Madonna and Child), while the blue sky is studded with eight-point stars (8, sideways, symbolises infinity).

The monochrome personifications of Vices and Virtues
The bottom tiers of the side walls feature 14 personifications in grisaille, representing single figures of Vices on the north wall and Virtues on the south wall. The Vices are Stultitia, Inconstantia, Ira, Iniusticia, Infidelitas, Invidia, and Desperatio. The Virtues are grouped as follows: the four cardinal virtues: Prudentia, Iustitia, Temperantia, Fortitudo, followed by the three theological ones: Fides, Karitas, Spes. Each virtue and vice is embedded within a mirror-like marble frame. The name of the vice or the virtue is written in Latin on top of each figure, indicating what these figures represent, namely, the seventh day (the time between Jesus's birth and the Final Judgement).

According to the controversial theory of Giuliano Pisani, the  Vices and Virtues read starting from the altar's side, going towards the counter-façade (Final Judgement), and the sequence is not "Vices first, then Virtues" as was long believed. It rather proceeds from Vice 1 (Stultitia) (north wall, right hand side) to Virtue 1 (Prudencia) (south wall, left hand side), to Vice 2 (Inconstantia) (north wall) to Virtue 2 (Fortitudo) (south side), and so on. Vices and Virtues symbolise humanity's progress toward bliss (heavenly happiness). With the aid of Virtues, humanity can overcome obstacles (Vices). This is the philosophical-theological itinerary designed by Giotto's theologian, a learned theologian who drew his inspiration from Saint Augustine. The Vice-Virtue section of the Arena Chapel illustrates the philosophical-theological message underlying the overall project and is key to clarifying several points previously considered to be either obscure or the result of Giotto's only approximate theological knowledge. For instance, in the Arena Chapel the vices are not the traditional capital vices or deadly sins (Pride, Envy, Wrath, Sloth, Greed, Gluttony and Lust), just like the "corresponding" virtues do not reflect the traditional order, consisting in four "cardinal virtues" (Prudence, Justice, Fortitude and Temperance) and three "theological virtues" (Faith, Hope and Charity). 

A twofold therapeutic path leading to salvation is presented. The first, composed of four virtues, brings a cure by means of the opposing force provided by the cardinal virtues. The arrival point in this first part of the itinerary is Justice, Iusticia, who makes peace possible and therefore ensures Paradise on earth and earthly happiness. The first Vice in this first section is Stultitia, namely the incapacity to distinguish good and evil. Its cure (opposite wall) is Prudencia, Prudence, which in classical and theological terms is not "cautiousness" but "moral intelligence" or the capacity to distinguish good and evil. The viewer is in the sphere of Knowledge. Next comes the pair Inconstantia, Inconstancy, (north wall) and Fortitudo, Fortitude, (south wall). Fortitude (moral and mental strength) triumphs over Inconstancy's lewd oscillations by means of will. "Inconstancy" is literally "the lack of a stable seat"; it is a mix of light-headedness, volubility, and inconsistency. "Inconstancy" is portrayed as a young woman rolling over a ball, ready to fall, on a motley marble floor signifying the lack of "unity" ("constancy") which characterizes an inconstant mind. Here is the sphere of Will. Wrath, the third vice, is "tempered" by Temperantia, Temperance. According to Saint Augustine, Temperantia is the inner balance which ensures the will's stable dominion over instincts and keeps human desires within the boundaries of honesty. It is the therapy necessary to prevail over passions, which are symbolized by Wrath, because Wrath is the most perilous of all the passions: it is sudden and destructive, even against own's dearest ones, and is therefore the passion that human beings first need to learn how to control. This notion is a tenet of ancient Greek and (in its footprints) Roman philosophy, which Saint Augustine made his own and Giotto's theologian transmitted to him, fusing together a number of Saint Augustine's writings. 

Prudence, Fortitude and Temperance pertain to each individual's ethical sphere of action and have as their goal the cure of each individual "self". Ethical virtue takes form in practical application, through action and behaviour that pertain both to the personal and the social sphere and affect human relations. The notions of Justice and Injustice, the central "pair" in Giotto's Arena Chapel, emanate from this notion. Justice’ perfect centrality is visually emphasized by an architectural "die", a small cube that runs above each of the various personifications in a slightly slanted way, pointing either toward the apse or the counter-façade, everywhere but above the head of Justice (south wall) and Injustice (north wall), where the small die falls in a perpendicular line, marking at the same time the exact physical half of the chapel as well as Justice's curing function from a theological-philosophical viewpoint, without forgetting that Justice is what cures the soul of the sickening effects of Injustice (on the chapel's other side).

Those who have successfully progressed in their therapeutic path have attained Justice. Those who have not, have attained Injustice. Those who have attained Justice have practiced a soul's therapy that can be defined as "human" and that led them to earthly happiness. They used as their therapy the "medicina animi", the "soul’s medicine" provided by the cardinal virtues (in the sequence Prudence-Fortitude-Temperance-Justice), namely the moral and intellectual virtues with whose "medicine" human beings can be cured of, and are able to prevail over, the opposing vices. 

Next come the theological virtues. In order to be able to aspire to heavenly Paradise one needs divine teaching, the revelation of truth, with which one overcomes and transcends human reason, and to practice the theological virtues. The "divine therapy" begins with the rejection of false beliefs (Infidelitas) through Faith in God (Fides). Only with the "medicine" of Charity (Karitas) can man overcome Selfishness and Envy (Invidia), which lead him to look with malevolent eyes (Latin in-vidēre) at his neighbour, who is also made by God in His likeness. Finally, with the aid (the medicine), Hope (Spes) can be contrasted with Lack of Hope, or Desperation (Desperatio). Hope is an attitude consisting in actively waiting for God's future blessings which descend from trust in God and in His word, and also consisting in love, through the love of God, of the whole of humankind. 

The sources of this extraordinary program were identified by Pisani in a number of passages of Saint Augustine's works. Everything finds a perfect correspondence with something else. It is the theme of the "therapy of opposites", the sequential order of the cardinal and theological virtues, and the centrality of Justice.

In Literature
Giotto's painting of Charity is frequently cited in Remembrance of Things Past by Marcel Proust. Mr. Swann likens the kitchen maid to this painting and it becomes something of a joke between him and the narrator.

Images

The life of Christ

Vices and Virtues

Other

References
Footnotes

Citations

Bibliography

 
 Bokody, Péter. "Justice, Love and Rape: Giotto’s Allegories of Justice and Injustice in the Arena Chapel, Padua." In The Iconology of Law and Order, ed. Anna Kerchy and others, 55–66. Szeged: JATE Press, 2012.
 Cordez, Philippe. "Les marbres de Giotto. Astrologie et naturalisme à la chapelle Scrovegni". In "Mitteilungen des kunsthistorischen Institutes in Florenz", 45/1 (2013), 8–25
 Derbes, Anne, and Mark Sandona.  The Usurer's Heart:  Giotto, Enrico Scrovegni, and the Arena Chapel in Padua.  Pennsylvania State University Press, 2008.
 Derbes, Anne, and Mark Sandona, eds.  The Cambridge Companion to Giotto.  Cambridge University Press, 2004.
 Frugoni, Chiara L'affare migliore di Enrico: Giotto e la cappella Scrovegni Einaudi, 2008
 Jacobus, Laura Giotto and the Arena Chapel: Art, Architecture and Experience Brepols/Harvey Miller Publications, 2008
 Ladis, Andrew Giotto's O Pennsylvania State University Press, 2008
 Giuliano Pisani, L'ispirazione filosofico-teologica nella sequenza Vizi-Virtù della Cappella degli Scrovegni, «Bollettino del Museo Civico di Padova», XCIII, 2004, Milano 2005, pp. 61–97
 Giuliano Pisani, Terapia umana e divina nella Cappella degli Scrovegni, in «Il Governo delle cose», dir. Franco Cardini, Firenze, n. 51, anno VI, 2006, pp. 97–106.
 Giuliano Pisani, L'iconologia di Cristo Giudice nella Cappella degli Scrovegni di Giotto, in «Bollettino del Museo Civico di Padova», XCV, 2006, pp. 45–65
 Giuliano Pisani, Le allegorie della sovrapporta laterale d'accesso alla Cappella degli Scrovegni di Giotto, in «Bollettino del Museo Civico di Padova», XCV, 2006, pp. 67–77.
 Giuliano Pisani, Il miracolo della Cappella degli Scrovegni di Giotto, in Modernitas – Festival della modernità (Milano 22–25 giugno 2006), Spirali, Milano 2006, pp. 329–57.
 Giuliano Pisani, Una nuova interpretazione del ciclo giottesco agli Scrovegni, in «Padova e il suo territorio», XXII, 125, 2007, pp. 4–8.
 Giuliano Pisani, I volti segreti di Giotto. Le rivelazioni della Cappella degli Scrovegni, Rizzoli, Milano 2008, pp. 1–366. ; Editoriale Programma, Treviso, 2015, pp. 1–366 .
 Giuliano Pisani, Il programma della Cappella degli Scrovegni, in Giotto e il Trecento, catalogo a cura di A. Tomei, Skira, Milano 2009, I – I saggi, pp.  113–127
 Giuliano Pisani, La fonte agostiniana della figura allegorica femminile sopra la porta palaziale della Cappella degli Scrovegni, in «Bollettino del Museo Civico di Padova», XCIX, 2010 (2014), pp.  35–46
 Stokstad, Marilyn; Art History, 2011, 4th ed., 
 Giuliano Pisani, La concezione agostiniana del programma teologico della Cappella degli Scrovegni, in Alberto da Padova e la cultura degli Agostiniani, a cura di F. Bottin, Padova University Press, Padova 2014, pp. 215–268
 Giuliano Pisani, Il capolavoro di Giotto. La Cappella degli Scrovegni, Editoriale Programma, Treviso, 2015, pp. 1–176 
 Giuliano Pisani, Dante e Giotto: la Commedia degli Scrovegni, in Dante fra il settecentocinquantenario della nascita (2015) e il settecentenario della morte (2021). Atti delle Celebrazioni in Senato, del Forum e del Convegno internazionale di Roma: maggio-ottobre 2015, ed. by E. Malato e A. Mazzucchi, Tomo II, Salerno Editrice, Roma 2016, pp. 799–815.
 Giuliano Pisani, Le passioni in Giotto, in El corazón es centro. Narraciones, representaciones y metáforas del corazón en el mundo hispánico, ed. by Antonella Cancellier, Cleup, Padova 2017, pp. 550–592.
 Giuliano Pisani, Giotto and Halley's Comet, in From Giotto to Rosetta. 30 Years of Cometary Science from Space and Ground, ed. by Cesare Barbieri and Carlo Giacomo Someda, Accademia Galileiana di Scienze, Lettere ed Arti, Padova 2017, 341–364.
 Schiller, Gertud, Iconography of Christian Art, Vol. I, 1971 (English trans from German), Lund Humphries, London, 

 Giuliano Pisani, The Scrovegni Chapel, Giotto's Revolution, Translation by Laura Orsi, Philip Harvey and Stefan Mattessich, Skira, Milano 2021, pp. 1-176 (ISBN 978-88-572-4452-5)

External links

 
 Virtual Tour and Information 
 Scrovegni Chapel Frescoes Analysis and Critical Reception

Giotto di Bondone
Roman Catholic churches in Padua
Roman Catholic chapels in Italy
Church frescos in Italy
Gothic paintings
Paintings by Giotto
Paintings in Padua
Giotto
Giotto
Giotto
Giotto
1300s paintings
14th-century Roman Catholic church buildings in Italy
Gothic architecture in Padua